Ferenc Gerő (14 August 1900 – 23 June 1974) was a Hungarian sprinter. He competed at the 1924 and 1928 Summer Olympics.

References

External links
 

1900 births
1974 deaths
Athletes (track and field) at the 1924 Summer Olympics
Athletes (track and field) at the 1928 Summer Olympics
Hungarian male sprinters
Olympic athletes of Hungary
Athletes from Budapest